Segundo may refer to:
Segundo (Juana Molina album), 2000
Segundo (Cooder Graw album), 2001
Segundo, Ponce, Puerto Rico, a barrio in the municipio of Ponce, Puerto Rico
Segundo River, a river in Cordoba, Argentina
, a United States submarine in commission from 1944 to 1970
Segundo, Colorado, an unincorporated community of Colorado

See also
Second (disambiguation)